A piton (also called pin or peg) in climbing is a metal spike (usually steel) that is driven into a crack or seam in the climbing surface using a climbing hammer, and which acts as an anchor for protecting the climber against the consequences of falling or to assist progress in aid climbing.  Pitons are equipped with an eye hole or a ring to which a carabiner is attached; the carabiner can then be directly or indirectly connected to a climbing rope.

Pitons were the original form of protection and are still used where there is no alternative.  Repeated hammering and extraction of pitons damage the rock, and climbers who subscribe to the clean climbing ethic avoid their use as much as possible.  With the popularization of clean climbing in the 1970s, pitons were largely replaced by faster and easier-to-use clean protection, such as nuts and camming devices. Pitons are still found in place (as "fixed" pitons) on some established free climbing routes, as fixed belay station anchors, in places where nuts or cams do not work; and are used on some hard aid climbs.

Styles and shapes

Pitons are sized and manufactured to fit a wide range of cracks.  From small to large, the most common are:
 RURP (Realized Ultimate Reality Piton) – a tiny piton the size of a postage stamp used in thin, shallow seams. It was designed by Tom Frost and Yvon Chouinard in 1959, and was manufactured by Chouinard Equipment in the 1960s. It is not a strong piece, and is mainly used for aid climbing, although it can feature as protection on extreme free routes (e.g. Rurp The Wild Berserk (E6 6b) at The Brand, Leicestershire, UK). More recent versions of the RURP include Bird Beaks and Peckers.
 Knifeblade – also known as Bugaboos, are thin straight pitons, that work in thin, deep cracks.
 Lost Arrow – designed by John Salathé and Yvon Chouinard, is a hot-forged, tapered piton that performs well in medium-size cracks.
 Angle – A piton made of steel sheet bent into a "U", "V", or "Z" shape; work well for larger cracks, where the steel deforms elastically as the piton is placed.
 Bongs – The largest pitons are angles made from aluminium sheet called bongs, named for the sound they produce while being hammered into place, or the sound they make when dropped.  Bongs have become rare with the advent of camming units, nuts (chocks) which protect the same wide cracks more easily, and without causing damage to the rock.
 Beaks – hooking pitons with the ability to hook, which can be placed without hammer.  Known often as Birdbeaks named for Jim Bridwell whose nickname was "The Bird".

Materials and evolution

Early pitons were made of malleable iron and soft steel and would deform to the shape of the crack when driven into the rock, which worked well in the irregular cracks found on European limestone.  Soft pitons are difficult to remove without damaging the piton, so they were frequently left in place and became fixed anchor points on a climb.

During climbing exploration of the hard granite in Yosemite Valley in the 1950s and 1960s, it was found that soft pitons did not work very well. The long routes developed in Yosemite made it impractical and costly to fix routes, and the soft pitons were not durable enough to be placed and removed more than a few times.  Pitons needed to be removed and used again on subsequent pitches, sometimes many times.  Leaving gear in place went against the ethics of many climbers.  John Salathé pioneered designs using hardened steel which were much tougher than the European pitons.  Salathé's pins, which he developed for a climb of the Lost Arrow, resisted deformation and were easier to remove and reuse, and were durable enough to be reused indefinitely.

In popular culture

Films
 In the James Bond film For Your Eyes Only (1981), James Bond (Roger Moore) makes use of pitons while climbing a sheer cliff face, as a means to infiltrate the villain Kristatos' (Julian Glover) hideout.  Just before he gets to the top of the cliff, Bond is met by Apostis, one of Kristatos' assassins.  Apostis tries to kill Bond by knocking his pitons out of the rock, which would cause Bond to fall to his death. Just before Apostis knocks out the last piton, Bond unclips another piton from his belt and uses it as a throwing knife, injuring Apostis and sending the assassin falling to his death.  Bond is then able to infiltrate Kristatos' hideout.
 Piton guns, fictional, handheld devices that shoot pitons into walls, appear in the 2004 Alien vs. Predator as part of the equipment of Charles Bishop's exploration team as they investigate what is revealed to be a pyramid where Predators breed and hunt Aliens.  Team members use the guns to shoot pitons into the walls of the chasm being used to enter the pyramid, and after much of them are slaughtered in the central battle between the two species, the sole survivor, Alexa Woods (Sanaa Lathan), uses one to kill an Alien while escaping back to the surface with the last surviving Predator, Scar, whom she allies with.

Games
 In the video game I Am Alive, the main character can also use a piton to rest and replenish their stamina while climbing for extended periods of time.
 In Uncharted 4: A Thief's End, Nathan Drake acquires a piton from a hanged corpse. The tool becomes more used in the later half of the game. In Uncharted: The Lost Legacy, pitons left behind by enemy mercenaries are used by Chloe Frazer and Nadine Ross.
 In the Hitman World Of Assassination Trilogy, a Piton can be used as a lethal weapon to stab targets, acquired by purchasing downloadable content.

Literature
 Dan Simmons' historical fiction novel, The Abominable (2013), centers on mountain climbing and frequently depicts passages in which piton use is crucial (e.g., Chapter 5). Additionally, the world class British Alpinist, Richard Davis Deacon, sneers at the Germans' heavy use of such equipment, while the narrator, his younger American protege, deems it brilliant (Chapter 6).

Television
 In the MacGyver season 2 episode "Eagles", MacGyver must climb a mountain to save baby eagles. Short of equipment, he uses tent stakes as pitons.
 The Alienist (TV series) Season 1 Episode 4 (These bloody thoughts), the two Jewish twins who works on the case, discover a metal tool on the ground of the crime scene. (the old immigration station, also known as the battery). One of the twins, called Marcus finds a 'piton' on the ground, which was used by their suspect.

See also 
 Copperhead
 Bolt
 Climbing equipment

References

Climbing equipment
Mountaineering equipment